Edy, provided by Rakuten, Inc. in Japan is a prepaid rechargeable contactless smart card.

Edy or EDY may also refer to:

People

Simon Edy
John William Edy

Other uses
EDY or East Didsbury railway station, Manchester, England (National Rail station code)
Edy, a 2005 film by Stéphan Guérin-Tillié
Edy's, the brand name used for Dreyer's ice cream in the eastern United States.

See also
Eddy (disambiguation)
Edie (disambiguation)